The Brazen Serpent may refer to one of these paintings showing a scene from the Old Testament (Numbers 21: 6–9):
 The Brazen Serpent (Rubens) -1635 and 1640  painting by Peter Paul Rubens
 The Brazen Serpent (Leonardo) - 1630-1640 painting by the Aragonese artist Jusepe Leonardo
 The Brazen Serpent (van Dyck) - 1618-1620 painting by the Flemish artist Anthony van Dyck